Sankou Town is an urban town in Liuyang City, Changsha City, Hunan Province, People's Republic of China. As of the 2000 census it had a population of 20,990 and an area of 55.5 square kilometers. Sankou merged to Gugang town on November 18, 2015

Cityscape
The town is divided into six villages and one community, the following areas: Guojiating Community, Jinyuan Village, Heyuan Village, Huacheng Village, Huaxiang Village, and Dongying Village (郭家亭社区，白露村、金园村、鹤源村、花城村、华湘村和东盈村).

References

Former township-level divisions of liuyang